Gabriela Medrano Galindo (born 27 June 1983) is a Mexican politician affiliated with the PVEM. She served as federal deputy of the LXII Legislature of the Mexican Congress representing Quintana Roo, and previously served as a local deputy in the XIII Legislature of the Congress of Quintana Roo.

References

1983 births
Living people
Politicians from Quintana Roo
People from Cancún
Women members of the Chamber of Deputies (Mexico)
Ecologist Green Party of Mexico politicians
21st-century Mexican politicians
21st-century Mexican women politicians
Members of the Congress of Quintana Roo
Deputies of the LXII Legislature of Mexico
Members of the Chamber of Deputies (Mexico) for Quintana Roo
Universidad Anáhuac Cancún alumni